A sabre squadron, or (in US English) saber squadron, is a unit of sub-battalion size, in some military ground forces.

The term originated in the British Army, and is derived from the sabre traditionally used by soldiers mounted on horses, including cavalry. It now typically refers to units descended directly from, or influenced by, traditional cavalry regiments, such as armoured or reconnaissance units. As such, a sabre squadron is generally equivalent to a company, in a conventional infantry unit.

The term has often been used by special forces units.  This usage stems largely from the adoption of sabre squadron as the name of company-level combat formations in the British Special Air Service. The Australian SAS also uses the term for its four sub-units.

See also
 Squadron (army)

References

Army units and formations